Paes is a Portuguese surname. Notable people with the surname include:

Bruno Paes, Brazilian football player
Dira Paes, Brazilian actress
Domingo Paes, Portuguese traveller 
Eduardo Paes, mayor of Rio de Janeiro
Fernando Paes, Portuguese equestrian
Jennifer Paes, Indian basketball player 
Júlia Paes, Brazilian model and singer
Juliana Paes, Brazilian actress and former model
Leander Paes, Indian professional tennis player 
Vece Paes, Indian hockey midfielder

Portuguese-language surnames
Surnames of Portuguese origin